The 1998 French Figure Skating Championships were held from December 12 to 14th, 1997 in Besançon. Medals were awarded in the disciplines of men's singles, ladies' singles, pair skating, and ice dancing. The event was one of the selection criteria for the 1998 Winter Olympics, the 1998 World Championships, and the 1998 European Championships.

Results

Men

Ladies

Pairs

Ice dancing

References

1997 in figure skating
French Figure Skating Championships, 1998
French Figure Skating Championships
1998 in French sport